Onda Cero is a Spanish radio station, a part of Atresmedia media group. It is Spain's third-largest radio station by number of listeners as of 2019.

Among its programs are Más de Uno, Julia en la Onda, La Brújula, El Transistor, Por Fin no es Lunes ( with Jaime Cantizano and América Valenzuela), and Radioestadio.

External links
Onda Cero Official Website

References 

Atresmedia
Radio stations in Spain
Radio stations established in 1990